I Can't Think Straight is a 2008 British romantic drama film directed by Shamim Sarif. Based on Sarif's 2008 novel of the same name, the film tells the story of a London-based Jordanian of Palestinian descent, Tala, who is preparing for an elaborate wedding when a turn of events causes her to have an affair, and subsequently fall in love, with another woman, Leyla, a British Indian. The film stars Lisa Ray and Sheetal Sheth.

I Can't Think Straight was produced by Enlightenment Productions and distributed in the United States by Regent Releasing and Here! Films. It was released in different regions between 2008 and 2009. The DVD was released on 4 May 2009.

The lead actresses, Ray and Sheth, also starred in Sarif's 2007 lesbian-themed historical drama film The World Unseen.

Plot

In the upper echelons of traditional Middle Eastern society, wealthy Christian Palestinians Reema and Omar prepare for the marriage of their visiting daughter Tala to Hani in Jordan. But back at work in London, Tala encounters Leyla, a young British Indian Muslim woman who is dating Tala's best friend Ali. Tala sees something unique in the artless, clumsy, sensitive Leyla who secretly works to become a writer. And Tala's forthright challenges to Leyla's beliefs begins a journey of self-awareness for Leyla. After a weekend getaway into the countryside, Tala and Leyla sleep together and the two women begin to fall in love. However, Tala's own sense of duty and cultural restraint cause her to pull away from Leyla and fly back to Jordan where the preparations for an ostentatious wedding are well under way.

As family members descend and the wedding day approaches, the pressure mounts until Tala finally cracks and extricates herself. Back in London, Leyla is heartbroken but learns to break free of her own self-doubt and her mother's expectations, ditching Ali and being honest with her parents about her sexuality. When Ali and Leyla's feisty sister, Yasmin, help try to get Tala and Leyla together again, Tala finds that her own preconceptions of what love can be is the final hurdle she must jump to win Leyla back.

Cast
 Lisa Ray as Tala
 Sheetal Sheth as Leyla
 Antonia Frering as Reema - Tala's mother
 Dalip Tahil as Omar - Tala's father
 Ernest Ignatius as Sam - Leyla's father
 Siddiqua Akhtar as Maya - Leyla's mother
 Amber Rose Revah as Yasmin - Leyla's sister
 Anya Lahiri as Lamia - Tala's middle sister
 Kimberly Jaraj as Zina - Tala's younger sister
 Rez Kempton as Ali - Tala's best friend, Leyla's boyfriend
 Daud Shah as Hani - Tala's fiancé
 Sam Vincenti as Kareem - Lamia's husband
 Ishwar Maharaj as Sami - Kareem's younger brother
 George Tardios as Uncle Ramzi
 Nina Wadia as Rani the Housekeeper

Critical reception 
The New York Times called the film "another weightless confection from the writer and director Shamim Sarif."

Autostraddle said that it "stands out for its cultural specificity, truly stunning leads, and endless charm."

AfterEllen's review notes, "While the film has a lot going for it, the script is surprisingly paint-by-the-numbers. Viewers familiar with lesbian films will be able to call the ending (and all major points of conflict) long before the credits roll. Also surprising is the number of cringe-worthy lines Ray and Sheth utter."

Awards
 Best Feature, Audience Award - Miami Gay & Lesbian Film Festival 2009
 Best Feature - International Gay and Lesbian Film Festival Of Canary Islands, 2009
 Best Feature - Afterellen Visibility Awards
 Best Feature, Audience Award - Melbourne Queer Film Festival 2009
 Best Feature, Audience Award - Pink Apple 2009
 Audience Award Best Feature Film - Fairy Tales International Queer Diversity Film Festival (Calgary) 2009
 Jury Winner Best Feature Film - Festival Del Mar, Majorca 2009
 Audience Award, Best Feature - Vancouver Queer Film Festival 2009
 Best lesbian movie - The Holebifilmfestival Vlaams-Brabant 2009, Belgium
 Jury award for Best Women's Feature - Tampa International Gay & Lesbian Film Festival 2009
 Best Feature Film - Gay Film Nights International Film Festival 2009

See also
 List of LGBT-related films directed by women

References

External links
 
  I Can't Think Straight at BBFC
  I Can't Think Straight at BFI
 
 I Can't Think Straight at Reeltime Creative

2008 films
2008 independent films
2008 LGBT-related films
2008 romantic drama films
British independent films
British LGBT-related films
British romantic drama films
2000s English-language films
Films based on British novels
Films based on romance novels
Films directed by Shamim Sarif
Films set in Jordan
Films set in London
Films shot in London
Lesbian-related films
LGBT-related romantic drama films
2000s British films